Evert Johannes Willem Verwey, also Verweij, (April 30, 1905 in Amsterdam – February 13, 1981 in Utrecht) was a Dutch chemist, who also did research in physical chemistry.

Verwey studied chemistry at the University of Amsterdam and obtained his MSc in 1929. From 1931 he worked as an assistant at the University of Groningen, where he obtained his PhD under the guidance of Hugo Rudolph Kruyt (1934, cum laude). In 1934 he moved to the Philips Laboratories in Eindhoven. He continued work on colloids, which was also the topic of his dissertation, and on oxides. The Verwey transition in magnetite is named after him.

Some of his studies on transition metal oxides (carried out jointly with de Boer) showed that some transition-metal oxides had electrical properties that could not be explained on the basis of band theory.

Between 1946 and 1967, together with physicist Hendrik Casimir and the engineer Herre Rinia, he was director of the Laboratories.

He is known for DLVO theory, a theory of the interaction of charged surfaces in fluids, which has applications, for example, in the description of colloids.

In 1949 he became a member of the Royal Netherlands Academy of Arts and Sciences. In 1967 he was awarded an honorary doctorate by the Delft University of Technology. He was also a curator at the University of Utrecht.

He was married to the sociologist and politician Hilda Verwey-Jonker (1908–2004).

See also
Charge ordering
Metal–insulator transition

References

External links
Verwey's biography in the 1981-1982 Yearbook of the Dutch Royal Academy of Sciences (in Dutch)

1905 births
1981 deaths
20th-century Dutch chemists
Members of the Royal Netherlands Academy of Arts and Sciences
Philips employees
Scientists from Amsterdam
University of Amsterdam alumni
University of Groningen alumni